Tuneweaver is a Neil Sedaka album released in 1995. The track "The Miracle Song" had already been released as a single in 1991. Many of the 20 tracks were 1991 re-recordings of hits from the 1960s and '70s.

Track listing 
 Love Will Keep Us Together (slow version) 
 My Son & I 
 Blinded by Your Love 
 Calendar Girl 
 Happy Birthday, Sweet Sixteen 
 When a Love Affair Is Through 
 My Athena 
 Breaking Up Is Hard to Do 
 Laughter in the Rain 
 Clown Time 
 The Miracle Song 
 Rainy Day Bells 
 Next Door to an Angel 
 Little Devil 
 Desiree 
 You Turn Me On 
 Oh! Carol 
 No Getting Over You 
 Stairway to Heaven 
 Run Samson Run

References

1995 albums
Neil Sedaka albums